The fourth season of the Peruvian reality singing competition La Voz Kids premiered on 19 October 2021 and broadcasts at 20:30 from Mondays through Saturdays. It is the return of the program to the Peruvian television screen after a five-year hiatus.

Eva Ayllón and Daniela Darcourt were confirmed to be coaches, after taking part in the regular and senior editions . They are joined by Panamanian singer-songwriter Joey Montana, and Grupo 5 band leader Christian Yaipén. Cristian Rivero and Gianella Neyra are the presenters of the program.

Gianfranco Bustios from team Daniela was proclaimed as the winner, marking Daniela's first win. Also, the victory of Bustios marks the first-ever stolen talent to win the entire show.

Teams 

  Winner
  Runner-up
  Eliminated in the Semi-final
  Eliminated in the Quarter-Finals
  Stolen in the Battles
  Eliminated in the Battles

Blind Auditions 
Blind auditions premiered on October 19. Coaches must have eighteen contestants on its respective team, with each coach is given three blocks to use in the entire blind auditions, with one block permitted to used during the contestant's performance.

Week 2 (October 25-30)

Week 3 (November 1-6)

The Battles 
Battle rounds started on November 6, same week as the blind audition was aired. Coaches are helped by their respective advisers. Susan Ochoa for Team Eva, Amy Guttiérez for Team Christian, Nicole Favre for team Joey , and Johnny Lau for Team Daniela 

The power to "Steal" is implemented this season, making it the seventh kids version to adopt "Steal" from regular version (the first one was the fifth season of Vietnamese kids version). Contrary to other versions where the steal is made off-stage, it is done while the contestants are on-stage. Coaches was given three "Steals" to save losing artist from another team.

Week 4 (November 8-13)

Quarter-Finals / Sing-Offs 
Quarter-finals begin on November 12, same week as the Battle rounds was aired. In the quarter-finals, the remaining 36 kid contestants sang the song of their choice, respectively. Artist who had been saved by coach, will go forward to the Semi-Finals.

Final Week

Live Semi-Finals 
Semi-Finals began at November 15. also, aired in a two-part episode. Two teams will perform  in an episode. Although the Semi-Finals was broadcast Live, it doesn't feature  interactive viewer voting component, and therefore no subsequent results shows. The top four artists (one per team) coming from the selection of the coaches. will advance to the Finals. 

Color key:

Live Grand Finals 
Grand Finals take place on November 17. As it is broadcasts Live, it  features interactive viewer voting component. Meaning, the determination of the winner will be from the vote of the public via televoting. Artist who gathered the most vote, will be proclaimed as the winner.

Color Key

References 

Peruvian television series
2021 Peruvian television seasons
Peru